Maria Quarra (born 26 January 1965) is an Italian yacht racer who competed in the 1992 Summer Olympics.

References

External links
 
 
 

1965 births
Living people
Italian female sailors (sport)
Olympic sailors of Italy
Sailors at the 1992 Summer Olympics – 470
Place of birth missing (living people)